TeleNiños is a Canadian Category B-exempt Spanish language specialty channel owned by TLN Media Group. TeleNiños broadcasts programming primarily aimed at children in addition to select family-oriented programming.

History
In October 2011, TLN Media Group, at the time a consortium majority owned by Corus Entertainment, was granted approval from the Canadian Radio-television and Telecommunications Commission (CRTC) to launch a television channel called All Spanish Children’s Television, described as "a national, niche third-language ethnic specialty Category B service devoted to providing programming to the Spanish-speaking community or to Canadians of Hispanic descent, and who are from preschool age to seventeen years of age."

The channel launched on November 1, 2011 as TeleNiños, exclusively on Vidéotron.  On December 4, 2014, TeleNiños launched on Bell Fibe TV.  On May 31, 2016, TeleNiños launched on Cogeco. On August 31, 2017, TeleNiños launched on Rogers.

As of February 11, 2019, it and sister channel Telebimbi have operated under exempt status. Shortly after, Corus sold its stake in Telelatino Network to the other co-owners.

Programming
TeleNiños broadcasts programming for kids of all ages, as well family-oriented programming.

Program list 
The Adventures of Paddington Bear
Are You Afraid of the Dark?
Arthur
Atomic Betty
Being Ian
Bobinogs
The Busy World of Richard Scarry
Caillou
Dark Oracle
Emily of New Moon
Flight Squad
Journey to the West: Legends of the Monkey King
The Legend of White Fang
The Little Lulu Show
Mona the Vampire
Mumble Bumble
The Mystery Files of Shelby Woo
Ripley's Believe It or Not! (1999 animated series)
Sci-Squad
Space Cases
Where on Earth Is Carmen Sandiego?
Wimzie's House
Zoboomafoo

References

External links

Children's television networks in Canada
Digital cable television networks in Canada
Latin American Canadian culture
Multicultural and ethnic television in Canada
Television channels and stations established in 2011
2011 establishments in Canada
Spanish-language television stations